The ney is a wind musical instrument, where the Turkish ney and Persian ney are subtypes.

Ney or NEY may also refer to:

Places 

 Ney, Germany, a municipality in Rhineland-Palatinate
 Ney, Iran, a village in Kurdistan Province
 Ney Ahmad Beyg, also known as Ney, a village in Ardabil Province, Iran
 Ney, Jura, France, a commune of the Jura département
 Ney, Ohio, United States, a village
 Ney, Leh, a village in Ladakh, India
 Ney Island, Nunavut, Canada
 Fort de Roppe, also known as Fort Ney, Belfort, France
 Fort Ney (Fransecky), Strasbourg, France

People 
 Neymar, nicknamed "Ney"
Ney (surname)
 Ney (given name)

Other uses
 ney, ISO 639-3 code for the Neyo language, spoken in Ivory Coast

See also
 Nei (disambiguation)
 Nay (disambiguation)
 Neigh (disambiguation)